The City of Canberra is a Boeing 747-438 delivered to Qantas in 1989. During its delivery from the Boeing Everett Factory in the United States, it made a non-stop flight from London Heathrow to Sydney. , this remains the longest non-stop un-refuelled delivery flight by an airliner.

Aircraft
The City of Canberra, registered VH-OJA, named after Australia's capital city, was the first Boeing 747-400 delivered to Qantas. It was not modified for the flight in any way – such as by the installation of extra fuel tanks – but some items of equipment were removed from the galleys and cargo compartments to save weight.

Record-breaking flight
The 747-438 took 20 hours and 9 minutes to fly a distance of 9,720 nautical miles (18,001 km) from London Heathrow to Sydney. The elapsed time was six minutes longer than the quickest non-stop England to Australia flight, which was made by an Avro Vulcan of the Royal Air Force in 1961. The City of Canberra set a record for the longest un-refuelled flight by a commercial aircraft, as the Vulcan was a military aircraft and had to be refuelled in flight several times while flying from RAF Scampton to RAAF Base Richmond near Sydney. 

Of interest is that the very same aircraft temporarily held the record for the shortest ever 747 flight: in March 2015, the City of Canberra flew from Sydney Kingsford-Smith airport to Illawarra Regional Airport, Shellharbour, with a flight time of 12 minutes.  This record (shortest 747 flight) now belongs to the last British Airways Boeing 747-400 still painted in the original BOAC livery.

Subsequent service

City of Canberra remained in service with Qantas until January 2015, when it was retired as part of the draw-down of the airline's fleet of 747s. The last commercial flight was from Johannesburg to Sydney. It was subsequently donated to the Historical Aircraft Restoration Society at the Illawarra Regional Airport via a delivery flight on 8 March 2015. Pilots trained on simulators for the landing and reduced the aircraft's weight including reducing the tyre pressure to 120 pounds per square inch from the typical 208, and carrying 25,400 litres of fuel, versus the maximum of 217,000 litres.

Ongoing display
The City of Canberra aircraft was placed on public display after a short period of decommissioning. On a tour of the Historical Aircraft Restoration Society at the Shellharbour Airport, members of the public can board the inside of the plane.

Namesakes
The City of Canberra name has also been carried by other first deliveries for Qantas, including two other Boeing 747s. The first Boeing 707-138 delivered in July 1959, the  first Boeing 747-238 delivered in August 1971 and the first Boeing 747-338 delivered in November 1984, all carried the name.

A 707-338C purchased by Qantas in 1967 also bore the name. As of 2021, that aircraft is still in service as a USAF E-8C Joint STARS airborne battle management aircraft.

References

Footnotes

Notes

Bibliography

External links

Boeing 747
Canberra
Individual aircraft
Qantas